The Pale Fountains were an English band formed in Liverpool in 1980, and composed of Mick Head (vocalist/guitarist), Chris McCaffery (bassist), Thomas Whelan (drummer) and trumpet player Andy Diagram (horns). Diagram was simultaneously a member of Dislocation Dance for most of the Pale Fountains' existence.

Career
Inspired by 1960s music such as Love, Burt Bacharach and The Beatles, the group released their debut single "(There's Always) Something on My Mind" on Les Disques du Crépuscule before signing a major label deal in October 1982. Although the Pale Fountains failed to make much commercial headway, the band would earn critical praise for the two albums released on Virgin, Pacific Street (1984) and ...From Across the Kitchen Table (1985), produced by Ian Broudie, who later found fame with The Lightning Seeds. Their sole UK Singles Chart Top 50 single was "Thank You", which reached No. 48 in 1982.

The band split up in 1987, with Mick Head going on to form Shack with his brother John. Andy Diagram had already left in 1984 and would later join James. Bassist and founder member Chris "Biffa" McCaffery died in 1989 of a brain tumour.

In November 2007, Head announced that he was reforming The Pale Fountains for two gigs. One at the Carling Academy in Liverpool on 2 February 2008, and another at the Shepherd's Bush Empire in London on 3 February 2008. The group remains particularly popular in France and Japan. Two compilations have been issued: Longshot For Your Love (Marina, 1998) and Something On My Mind (Crépuscule, 2013), the latter with a bonus live CD recorded in 1982.

Members
 Mick Head – vocals, guitar (1981–1987)
 Chris McCaffery – bass guitar (1981–1987; died 1989)
 Thomas Whelan – drums (1981–1987)
 Andy Diagram – trumpet (1982–1984)
 John Head – guitar (1984–1987)

Discography

Albums

Studio albums

Compilation albums

Singles

See also
 Shack
 Michael Head & The Red Elastic Band

References

External links
[http://www.michaelhead.co.uk Michael Head's Official Website 
Shacknet – The Magical World of Shack & Pale Fountains
Pale Fountains biography page at Crépuscule

English new wave musical groups
English pop music groups
Jangle pop groups
Musical groups from Liverpool
Musical groups established in 1981
Musical groups disestablished in 1987